Parshino is a rural locality (a passing loop) in Chernyshkovskoye Urban Settlement, Chernyshkovsky District, Volgograd Oblast, Russia. The population was 5 as of 2010.

Geography 
The village is located 12 km of Chernyshkovsky. Yarskoy is the nearest rural locality.

References 

Rural localities in Chernyshkovsky District